Kiriku (born 17 December 2014), also known as Enorense Victory, is a Nigerian comedian, content creator and child actor.

Background 
Kiriku is of Benin descent from Edo State. He is part Urhobo. He is the brother to Umbrella Boy, who is also his manager. And He is the last child of a family of four siblings.

Career 
Kiriku started comedy at age four. He came into the limelight after his skits were posted severally by Instablog9ja and Tunde Ednut. He started his career in his hometown, Benin City, before moving to Lagos - which is Nigeria's entertainment capital - to continue pursuing a career in comedy. He has had collaborative works with Broda Shaggi, Mr Funny and Iyanya. He has also had comedy collaborative works with Officer Woos and Cute Abiola. He was called the most sought after child comic actor in Nigeria by The Sun.

Awards 
Kiriku won the award for the Breakout Social Content Creator of the Year 2022 at the Net.ng awards.

Personal life 
Kiriku alongside his brother bought two Mercedes Benz cars for their parents in 2022, as a token of appreciation. Citing his reason for buying a car for his parents as being that his father's car had become too old and faulty over the years, and he had always dreamed of getting his father a new car once he had the financial capacity to.

References

Notes

Citations 

 

2014 births
Living people
 People from Edo State
Comedy YouTubers
English-language YouTube channels
Nigerian children
Nigerian YouTubers
Nigerian male actors
21st-century Nigerian male actors